Flagship is the self-titled debut LP by American alt-rock band Flagship, released on October 8, 2013 by Bright Antenna Records. The album was made available as a Digital Download, CD and Double Vinyl.

The first song off the album, "Are You Calling," premiered in a lyric video on the website Metrolyrics on July 12, 2013.

Track listing

Are You Calling - 3:52
Holy Ghost - 3:52
Break the Sky - 5:53
Waste Them All - 2:48
Wagon - 3:25
Fever - 3:19
Neverland - 3:56
I Do - 3:51
Life Underwater - 3:28
Gold and Silver - 5:48
The Wilderness - 3:41
Hollywood Underwater - 2:57
Fear of Falling - 4:05
Calm Me Down (Bonus Track) - 2:55
Some Other Way (Bonus Track) - 3:31
What It's All About (Bonus Track) - 3:37

Personnel
Flagship:
Drake Margolnick
Grant Harding
Matthew Padgett
Chris Comfort
Michael Finster
Cole Moser (Live)
Produced By:
Ben H. Allen III (1,4,5,7,8,9,10,11,13)
Flagship (2,3,6,12)
Rich Costey (3)
Mixed By:
Ben H. Allen III (4,5,7,8,11)
Rich Costey (3)
Will Brierre (1,2,9,10)
Grant Harding (6,12,13)
Engineered By:
Jason Kingsland
Grant Harding
Assistant Engineering:
Alex Tumay
Sumner Jones
Joseph D'Agostino
Jeremy Snyder
Joe Pell
Mastered By:
Greg Calbi at Sterling Sound
Darian Cowgill at The Den Recorders (11,12,13)
Talent
Wes Funderburk, Trombone: "Wilderness"
Jay Hanselman, French Horn: "Wilderness"
Joe Grandsen, Trumpet: "Wilderness"
Ben H. Allen III, Guitar: "I Do"
Album Artwork:
Eric Hurtgen
Miguel Ayala
A&R:
Braden Merrick

References

External links
Release on Discogs.com
LA Music Blog
Indie Is Not a Genre
MTV

2013 albums
Flagship (band) albums
Albums produced by Ben H. Allen